Hugo Pérez may refer to:

Hugo Pérez (soccer) (born 1963), American international association football player
Hugo Pérez (footballer, born 1968), Argentine international association football player
Hugo Pérez (footballer, born 2002), Spanish footballer